Cogshell Branch is a stream in Ripley County in the U.S. state of Missouri. It is a tributary of Cypress Creek.

Cogshell Branch has the name of Caleb Cogshell, an early settler.

See also
List of rivers of Missouri

References

Rivers of Ripley County, Missouri
Rivers of Missouri